Latvian Bishops' Conference is the national Roman Catholic Bishops' Conference in Latvia. It is headquartered in Riga and is a member of the Council of European Episcopal Conferences (CCEE) and the Commission of the Bishops' Conferences of the European Community (COMECE). It was founded as coordinator of the Latvian bishops on 15 November 1997, and held its inaugural meeting on 29 June 1998, starting off with a Pontifical High Mass in the Basilica of the Assumption in Aglona. Its first president was Cardinal Jānis Pujats, then archbishop of Riga.

The statutes, structure and functioning of the Bishops' Conference are based on the documents of the Second Vatican Council enshrined in the Code of Canon Law (CIC) Art. 447 ff of 1983. Other members are:

 Zbigņevs Stankevičs, archbishop of Riga
 Jānis Pujats, retired archbishop of Riga
 Jānis Cakuls, retired Auxiliary Bishop of Riga
 Vilhelms Lapelis, Bishop Emeritus (retired) of Liepāja
 Edvards Pavlovskis, bishop of Jelgava
 Antons Justs, bishop emeritus of Jelgava
 Jānis Bulis, bishop of Rēzekne-Aglona and current conference president
 Viktors Stulpins bishop of Liepāja

See also
 Roman Catholicism in Latvia

References

External links
  Latvian Bishops' Conference
 Episcopal Conference of Latvia from GCatholic.org

Latvia
Catholic Church in Latvia